Kevin Trapp (born June 27, 1984 in Minnesota) is a former American soccer player.

Career

Youth and College
Trapp grew up in Charlotte, North Carolina, and played college soccer at James Madison University, where he was a four year starter. He currently holds the school's freshmen shutout record with 8 shutouts, and is ranked second all-time at JMU in shutouts for career with 26.  Trapp was consistently ranked in leaders among the CAA Conference and within the Top 10 for the NCAA in GAA and saves all 4 years as a starter at James Madison University.  Trapp's efforts in goal helped aid in JMU's Top 25 national ranking during the 2003-2006 seasons, with Top 10 national rankings in both the 2004 and 2005 seasons.  During the 2004 and 2005 season, Trapp was understudied by Matt Glaeser who later transferred to the University of Hartford.

As a club player he won four North Carolina State Championships, Southwest Regional Champion, and was a 2000 United States Youth Soccer Association National Finalist.  Trapp also earned a two-time All State, All-Region and All-County honoree, was named to the Charlotte Observer All-Star team, and was a three-time All-Southwestern 4A Conference player in high school for Myers Park High School.

Professional
Kevin Trapp was drafted in the 3rd Round by the Detroit Ignition in the 2007 Major Indoor Soccer League MISL draft, but did not report to camp to pursue a career within the MLS and USL soccer leagues.  Trapp was signed to his first professional contract by the Western Mass Pioneers in 2007 and was their first-choice goalkeeper throughout the season.  Trapp led the league his rookie season in minutes and ranking within the top 3 within the United Soccer League for saves, and was voted MVP for the 1st Round of the 2007 Lamar Hunt US Open Cup tournament.  He transferred to the Charlotte Eagles in 2008 to be understudy to Terry Boss, making four appearances in his first year with the team.  After Boss was red-carded in the semi-final match against Real Maryland Monarchs, Trapp was selected the starter for the Eagle's in the 2008 USL Division 2 National Championship match, where they finished as finalist falling to the Cleveland City Stars 2-1 in regular time netting 9 saves total.  At the start of the 2009 regular season, Trapp was deemed as the Charlotte Eagles starting goalkeeper, and had instrumental performances against the Wilmington Hammerheads, Richmond Kickers, Bermuda Hogges, and Crystal Palace Baltimore to help secure the Eagle's road back to their 7th National Championship title match.  He is currently the Eagles' first choice goalkeeper.

References

External links
 Charlotte Eagles bio

Living people
1984 births
American soccer players
Charlotte Eagles players
James Madison Dukes men's soccer players
Western Mass Pioneers players
USL Second Division players
Soccer players from Minnesota
Place of birth missing (living people)
Soccer players from Charlotte, North Carolina
Association football goalkeepers